Sun Mengxin (born April 8, 1993) is a Chinese basketball player. She represented China in the basketball competition at the 2016 Summer Olympics.

References

External links

Chinese women's basketball players
Basketball players at the 2016 Summer Olympics
Olympic basketball players of China
1993 births
Living people
Forwards (basketball)
Basketball players from Shandong
Sportspeople from Zibo
Bayi Kylin players